The South Africa national ice hockey team is the national men's ice hockey team of South Africa. It is controlled by the South African Ice Hockey Federation and has been a member of the International Ice Hockey Federation (IIHF) since 25 February 1937. As of 30 May 2022, South Africa is currently ranked 51st in the IIHF World Ranking and competes in Division III B of the IIHF World Championships. It is the only African-based team that competes in IIHF tournaments.

World Championship record

All-time record against other nations
As of 18 March 22

All-time record against other teams
As of 28 March 2012

References

External links

IIHF profile

 
Ice hockey in South Africa
National ice hockey teams in Africa